Korie Howard Robertson (born October 24, 1973) is a reality television star on the A&E show Duck Dynasty.

Robertson is the daughter of John and Chrys Howard, and the daughter-in-law of Phil Robertson, founder of the Duck Commander. Her husband is Willie Robertson. Together, they have six children: John Luke, Sadie, Will, Bella, Rowdy, and Rebecca.

Robertson attended Harding University in Searcy, Arkansas. In 2014, Harding University declared Willie and Korie Howard Robertson jointly as Outstanding Young Alumni.

She sang on her family's album, Duck the Halls: A Robertson Family Christmas.

She publicly stood up for her father-in-law after his controversial interview in GQ magazine.

She is a granddaughter of businessman Alton Hardy Howard and a great-niece of Alton Hardy's brother, W. L. "Jack" Howard, former mayor of Monroe. Alton and Jack Howard were proprietor of the former Howard Brothers Discount Stores. Another great-uncle was the Church of Christ minister V. E. Howard.

References

Living people
American members of the Churches of Christ
Participants in American reality television series
People from West Monroe, Louisiana
Harding University alumni
Robertson family
Howard family (Louisiana)
1973 births